Pedro Régis is a municipality in the state of Paraíba in the Northeast Region of Brazil.

See also
List of municipalities in Paraíba

References

Municipalities in Paraíba